In 1992–93, the Serie A title was retained by Milan, who finished four points ahead of Internazionale. Third placed Parma enjoyed European glory in the European Cup Winners Cup, while unfancied Cagliari crept into the UEFA Cup qualification places at the expense of the 1991 champions and 1992 European Cup finalists Sampdoria. Roma and Napoli finished mid table after disappointing campaigns, while Brescia, Fiorentina, Ancona and Pescara were all relegated.

Teams
Brescia, Pescara, Ancona and Udinese had been promoted from Serie B.

Number of teams by region

Personnel and Sponsoring

League table

Results

Relegation tie-breaker

Brescia relegated to the 1993–94 Serie B.

Top goalscorers

References

Sources
Almanacco Illustrato del Calcio - La Storia 1898-2004, Panini Edizioni, Modena, September 2005

External links

1992-93 Season results, at RSSSF

Serie A seasons
Italy
1992–93 in Italian football leagues